The Tavignano is a river on the island of Corsica, France.

Course

In antiquity the river was known as the Rhotanus or Ῥότανος.
It crosses the communes of Aléria, Altiani, Antisanti, Casamaccioli, Corte, Erbajolo, Giuncaggio, Piedicorte-di-Gaggio, Poggio-di-Venaco, Riventosa, Santa-Lucia-di-Mercurio, Santo-Pietro-di-Venaco and Venaco.

The Tavignano rises below the  Capu a u Tozzu and flows to the east.
It runs through Lac de Nino near its source.
Part of the river's upper section flows through the Réserve biologique intégrale du Tavignano.
It then flows through the town of Corte.
From Corte it runs southeast to the Tyrrhenian Sea near Aléria, followed by the T50 road.
it enters the sea between the Étang de Diane and the Étang del Sale.
Its entire course is in the Haute-Corse département.

Hydrology

Measurements of the river flow were taken at the Antisanti [Pont du Faïo] station from 1996 to 2021.

Tributaries
The following streams (ruisseaux) are tributaries of the Tavignano, ordered by length:

 Tagnone (river) 
 Vecchio (river) 
 Corsiglièse 
 Restonica (river) 
 Rio Magno 
 Zincajo 
 Minuto 
 Limone 
 Santa Lucia 
 Saninco 
 Pettilargo 
 Alzeda 
 Casaloria 
 Lavagnano 
 Bistuglio 
 Salgerete 
 Orta 
 Catone 
 Terranella 
 Vado 
 Vacile 
 Furmicuccia 
 Valle 
 Mucchiello 
 Rosajo 
 Giovannaccia 
 Figamellare 
 Javinelle 
 Castagnolu 
 Scrocchiella 
 Ombrone 
 Antia 
 Riu Ficu 
 Crivia 
 Paratelle 
 Torbia 
 Acqua Viva 
 Vallerone 
 Casaperta 
 Figamorella 
 Malasarto 
 Creciani 
 Castagno 
 Suarte 
 Pizzu Guardu 
 Cannicciole 
 l'Aghiola 
 Campo di Vindico 
 Valle Tose 
 Cantinche 
 Francesch Andrea 
 Valle Maluse 
 Palmurato 
 Valle Allo Pero 
 Pietracchiolo 
 Torcelle 
 Scampajolo 
 Valle 
 Piedimurelli 
 Spelonche 
 Finochietta 
 Vaccherucci 
 Peccaio 
 Tromba 
 Tribbiatoghia 
 Castelluccia 
 Malanotte 
 Pescaja 
 Suartello 
 Olmo 
 Ficaghiola 
 Pietrelle 
 Costadi 
 Tiferi 
 Stazzalello 
 Sparabetto

References

Sources

Rivers of Haute-Corse
Rivers of France
Coastal basins of the Tyrrhenian Sea in Corsica